The Louie James House is a property listed on the National Register of Historic Places located in Greer, South Carolina. The two-story Colonial Revival frame house on a brick basement foundation was built in 1923 for William Louis James. It was designed by the architect Henry R. Trott, from Greenville, South Carolina based architectural firm Jones and Trott.

The L-shaped house features 5 chimneys and has a Roman Doric style porch with a terra cotta-tiled terrace along the entire width of the house. Interior features include Roman Doric columns, decorative mouldings, pilasters and an arched vestibule. The majority of the interior light fixtures are original to the house.

References

Houses on the National Register of Historic Places in South Carolina
Colonial Revival architecture in South Carolina
Houses completed in 1923
Houses in Greenville County, South Carolina
Greer, South Carolina
National Register of Historic Places in Greenville County, South Carolina